Pamplin Music was an independent Christian record label founded in 1995 by Robert B. Pamplin Jr. The label was a subunit of Pamplin Entertainment and in turn Pamplin Communications, which was already established in the Christian media market through book stores and video products.

Pamplin Music reported turning a profit in 1999 as well as being in the top five Christian music record labels. Despite this, Pamplin closed at the end of 2001, shuttering both its production and distribution operations.

Pamplin focused on the pop, soft rock, and R&B market segments. For other segments, they used sublabels. Red Hill Records, established in 2000 with A&R handled by Dan Michaels (according to Billboard), focused on electronic and pop music, and was generally aimed at the youth market. Organic Records was their label for alternative and modern rock artists. Cathedral Records and Crossroads served the gospel market segments. Cathedral did not close with the other sublabels, and established distribution through New Day Distribution.

Distribution

While previous releases from parent company Pamplin Entertainment such as the Bibleman series had used existing distribution channels, with the establishment of Pamplin Music, the company began distributing its own material. In 1997 they began providing services to other labels as well. Distributed labels include:
Audience Records
Calvary Chapel Music
Discovery House Music
Infiniti Records
KMG Records
Maranatha!
Rustproof Records
Sonlite
Tyscot

Artists

Pamplin Records
Acquire the Fire
Billy Batstone
Charles Billingsley (formerly of Newsong)
Church of Rhythm
The Darins
Jody Davis
John Elefante
Kevin Jackson (formerly of Chase)
Rick Elias
Scott Faircloff
Five O'clock People
Vestal Goodman
Natalie Grant
Tracy Harris
Timothy James Meaney
Nikki Leonti
Lloyd
Sara Paulson
Phatfish
Sierra
Solomon's Wish
SpinAround
Melissa Tawlks (formerly of Acquire the Fire)
Truth
Two Or More
Jeni Varnadeau (currently known as Alexa James)

Organic Records
Bride
The Channelsurfers (aka The Channel Surfers)
The Corbans
The Frantics
Human
Jesus Music
Mayfair Laundry
Sappo
Say-So
Scarecrow and Tinmen
Split Level
Aaron Sprinkle
Spy Glass Blue
Stereo Deluxx
This Train
Dale Thompson
Tragedy Ann
The World Inside

Red Hill Records
Ash Mundae
Aurora
The Echoing Green
Katy Hudson (currently known as Katy Perry)
Kindred Three

Audience Records
Jason Ingram Band
Everett Darren
Selena Bloom
Moriah

References

Christian record labels
American independent record labels
Record label distributors
Record labels established in 1996
Record labels disestablished in 2001
Defunct companies based in Oregon
Oregon record labels
1995 establishments in Oregon
2001 disestablishments in Oregon